Frances A. Genter (February 17, 1898 – November 24, 1992) was a major figure in American Thoroughbred horse racing. She is best known as the owner of Unbridled, the 1990 American Champion Three-Year-Old Male Horse and winner of the 1990 Kentucky Derby and Breeders' Cup Classic. Part of horse racing lore took place at the 1990 Kentucky Derby when trainer Carl Nafzger called the race aloud to the petite 92-year-old Mrs. Genter because her eyesight was failing & she could not see as her horse headed down the stretch en route to winning the race. The staff of Blood-Horse Publications selected the scene for its book Horse Racing's Top 100 Moments.

Born on a farm near Wyalusing, Pennsylvania, while in her teens the family moved to Minneapolis, Minnesota. She and her husband, Harold, became involved in the sport of horse racing in 1940. After her husband's death in 1981 she continued buying, breeding and  racing  Thoroughbreds with her son-in-law, Bentley Smith, managing the operation for her.

Beyond her racing success with Unbridled, over the years Mrs. Genter won numerous top races in the United States including the 1986 Breeder's Cup Sprint with the colt, Smile. Among her other top runners was My Dear Girl, voted the 1959 American Champion Two-Year-Old Filly.

Mrs. Genter was voted the Eclipse Award for Outstanding Owner in 1990 and the following year received the Mr. Fitz Award from the National Turf Writers Association that is awarded to an individual who most exemplifies the spirit of horse racing.

External links

References

1898 births
1992 deaths
People from Wyalusing, Pennsylvania
American racehorse owners and breeders
Owners of Kentucky Derby winners
Eclipse Award winners
Sportspeople from Minneapolis